Antonio Olivari was born on 28 September 1980. He is a songwriter and composer from Ħamrun, Malta and has written songs in English and in Maltese.

Music career
Antonio Olivari issued his first two albums with instrumental compositions between 2000 and 2001 through MP3.com. These were called "Islanded in One's World" (2000) and "Anima" (2001). These albums are not available anymore, but some of the tracks were reissued on an album called "Mist: Relaxing Instrumental Music". According to researcher and promoter of Maltese music Toni Sant, "Olivari was one of a handful of Maltese musicians who published their work through MP3.com back when the site was a non-commercial hotbed of unsigned acts".

In 2007, Antonio wrote and recorded the theme-song for the Żgħażagħ Ħaddiema Nsara annual concert Strummin' Home entitled 'Keep on Strummin', which had Errol Cutajar singing the lead vocal accompanied by the ŻĦN Symphonik Choir. Antonio was, between 2007 and 2011, one of the members in the ŻĦN Symphonik rock band, which organised non-profit concerts to raise awareness on a variety of social issues.

In 2008, Antonio composed the music for the opening sequence of television programme X-Lab, which was broadcast on TVM (Malta) and on the Cyprus Broadcasting Corporation. He also wrote and recorded another song for the ŻĦN Symphonik choir called 'The Language of Music', which is sung by Melanie Saliba, and participated in the concert Akustika 3, held at the Saint James Cavalier. During this concert, four of Antonio's original songs were performed ('Vain', 'Issa Tard Wisq', 'The Coffee Song' and 'DIY Blues').

In 2009, Antonio released an online album called 'Dark Ages', which is available at PinkPube.com. Reviews of the album included comments such as "the songs, which mainly feature an acoustic guitar accompanied by ethereal guitar effects in the background, sound otherworldly and dark; a very good dream pop album. Tracks of note include The End of Time and The Clown Song". In February he played at the launch of the book 'Qed Nistenniek Nieżla max-Xita' by well-known Gozitan author Pierre J. Mejlak, and in March Antonio performed once again with the Akustika band during Akustika 4. Like in the previous year, original songs were performed ('Pull Me Back', 'Vain', and 'Wine Bar Blues').

In 2010, Antonio composed the soundtrack for the second season of the Maltese local television series 'Għeruq', which was produced by Hermann Bonaci Productions and broadcast on NET Television (Malta) at prime-time. On Friday 4 June, he performed with Justin Galea at Għanafest 2010, an annual Mediterranean folk music festival organised by the Malta Council for Culture and the Arts, and in summer he collaborated with his brother Carlo on the closing song for the television series 'Il-Prinċep tal-Warda Bajda', produced by Foxy Nixy and broadcast every Friday afternoon on ONE TV. Furthermore, Antonio composed an original soundtrack for a new TV Series called 'Il-Misteru tan-Nannu Ton', which was broadcast on Maltese National Broadcaster TVM (Television Malta) twice a week in 2011.

Antonio is also the founding member of Mistura, which is a blues-progressive rock band he formed with Malcolm Bonnici. Mistura issued their first album, called 'U d-Dinja Tkompli Ddur'  in 2014, issued 'Regħbus' in 2018  and 'MMXX' in 2020. Mistura sings entirely in Maltese.

L-Għanja tal-Poplu
Antonio has participated in the L-Għanja tal-Poplu festival in 2008, 2009, 2010 and in the 2012 edition. In 2008, he qualified with the songs 'Isbaħ Jum', sung by Justin Galea, and 'Se Ngħaddi 'l Hawn', co-written with and sung by Corazon Mizzi. In 2009, he qualified again with the song 'Attent' and placed third. 'Attent' was sung by Justin Galea. In 2010, he again participated with two songs: one entitled 'Bażar' sung by Justin Galea and another with Tale Kwali called 'Sur Wara Sur'. In 2012, Antonio participated with yet another two songs. The first, as part of Tale Kwali, was called 'Blokk Appartamenti' while the second song, with his then new band called Mistura, was called 'Isma' Bilfors'. The latter won the prize for Best New Talent.

Partial song list
"Isbaħ Jum" : released on L-Għanja tal-Poplu 2008 compilation CD, lyrics and music - Antonio Olivari. Sung by Justin Galea.
"Se Ngħaddi 'l Hawn" : released on L-Għanja tal-Poplu 2008 compilation CD, lyrics - Corazon Mizzi, music - Antonio Olivari. Sung by Corazon.
"Attent" : released on L-Għanja tal-Poplu 2009 compilation CD, lyrics and music - Antonio Olivari. Sung by Justin Galea.
"Bażar" : released on L-Għanja tal-Poplu 2010 compilation CD, lyrics and music - Antonio Olivari. Sung by Justin Galea.
"Sur Wara Sur" : released on L-Għanja tal-Poplu 2010 compilation CD, lyrics - Antonio Olivari, music - Stephen Ferrito. Sung by Tale Kwali.
"Blokk Appartamenti" : released on L-Għanja tal-Poplu 2012 compilation CD, lyrics and music - Antonio Olivari. Sung by Tale Kwali.
"Isma' Bilfors" : released on L-Għanja tal-Poplu 2012 compilation CD, lyrics and music - Antonio Olivari. Sung by Mistura.
"Il-Prinċep tal-Warda Bajda" : unreleased, lyrics - Carlo Olivari D'Emanuele, music - Antonio Olivari. Sung by Melanie Olivari Saliba.
"The Link" : online release as part of Dark Ages in 2009, music - Antonio Olivari.
"The End of Time" : online release as part of Dark Ages in 2009, lyrics and music - Antonio Olivari. Sung by Melanie Olivari Saliba.
"The Quest" : online release as part of Dark Ages in 2009, music - Antonio Olivari.
"The Clown Song" : online release as part of Dark Ages in 2009, lyrics - Marco Vella, music - Antonio Olivari. Sung by Marco Vella.
"Winter Light" : online release as part of Dark Ages in 2009, music - Antonio Olivari.
"And the Time is Lost" : online release as part of Dark Ages in 2009, lyrics and music - Antonio Olivari. Sung by Melanie Olivari Saliba.
"Keep On Strummin" : released by ŻĦN on CD in 2007, lyrics and music - Antonio Olivari. Sung by Errol Cutajar.
"The Language of Music" : online release by ŻĦN Symphonik in 2008, lyrics and music - Antonio Olivari. Sung by Melanie Olivari Saliba.
"Vain" : online release of live performance in 2008, lyrics and music - Antonio Olivari. Sung by Isabel Zammit.
"Issa Tard Wisq" : online release of live performance in 2008, lyrics and music - Antonio Olivari. Sung by Justin Galea.
"The Coffee Song" : online release of live performance in 2008, lyrics and music - Antonio Olivari. Sung by Justin Galea.
"DIY Blues" : online release of live performance in 2008, lyrics and music - Antonio Olivari. Sung by Isabel Zammit and Justin Galea.
"Pull Me Back" : online release of live performance in 2009, lyrics and music - Antonio Olivari. Sung by Jean Claude Vancell.
"Wine Bar Blues" : online release of live performance in 2009, lyrics and music - Antonio Olivari. Sung by Isabel Zammit, Janice Debattista and Jean Claude Vancell.

References

Maltese songwriters
Maltese composers
Living people
1980 births